Territorial spirits are national angels, or demons, who rule over certain geographical areas in the world, a concept  accepted within the Charismatic movement, Pentecostal traditions, and Kingdom Now theology. This belief has been popularized by the novel, This Present Darkness by Frank Peretti, as well as by the ministry of Peter Wagner. The existence of territorial spirits is viewed as significant in spiritual warfare within these Christian groups.

Biblical context

Deuteronomy 32:8-9
In both the Septuagint and the Dead Sea Scrolls, Deuteronomy 32:8-9 refers to a time when God divided the nations of the earth among the "sons of God" (Israel is excepted as the special possession of God Himself.) Given the meaning of this phrase in the Book of Job, it is suggested that this is a reference to the origin of territorial spirits who were, at one time, angels administering the earth on God's behalf. Wagner appeals to F. F. Bruce, who points out that the Septuagint reading "implies that the administration of various nations has been parcelled out among a corresponding number of angelic powers."  The question remains, however, as to whether these spirits are malevolent.

Psalm 82
Psalm 82 speaks of "elohim" who are "sons of the most High" and are assigned to judge mankind until dying like men or "falling like one of the princes". Psalm 58 covers similar ground.

Daniel 10
Daniel 10 concerns the visitation of a man "His body was like topaz, his face like lightning, his eyes like flaming torches, his arms and legs like the gleam of burnished bronze, and his voice like the sound of a multitude" to the prophet Daniel. This man explains to Daniel that he was delayed by the "Prince of Persia" (10:13), but was helped by "Michael, one of the chief princes" (a reference to the Michael the Archangel, who was recognized in Jewish literature to be a chief angel guarding over Israel). Later in the chapter, the man warns Daniel that soon the "Prince of Greece" (10:20) will join his Persian counterpart to make war upon them.

Wagner regards this chapter as a key passage supporting the existence of territorial spirits, and appeals to Keil and Delitzsch, who suggest that the "prince of Persia" is the "guardian spirit of the kingdom." George Otis says that Daniel 10 is "a well-defined case of an evil spiritual being ruling over an area with explicitly defined boundaries." David E. Stevens notes that many scholars take the Prince of Persia to be an earthly political authority, such as Cambyses II. Stevens personally accepts the angelic interpretation, but argues that the "influence exerted by these angelic princes is personal and sociopolitical in nature and not territorial." Stevens notes that in Daniel 12:1, Michael the Archangel, is described as "the great prince who protects your people" (NIV), which "emphasizes the protective role of Michael in relation to the people of God rather than with respect to a given territory. Michael remained the guardian angel of the people of God, whether Israel was in the Promised Land or was dispersed in exile among the nations."

Criticism
Melvin Tinker argues that the literary use of territorial spirits is a misnomer, since spirits referred to in various Biblical passages "are to be more associated with political and religious power and ideologies."

Scholars such as Robert Priest, Paul Hiebert and A. Scott Moreau detect animist ideas in the arguments of supporters of the theory of territorial spirits. Robert Guelich of Fuller Theological Seminary does not find the concept of territorial spirits within the Gospels, and has analyzed this problem in a critical review of Frank E. Peretti's novel This Present Darkness.

Peter Wagner promotes "Strategic-Level Spiritual Warfare" (SLSW) which involves the practice of learning the names and assignments of demonic spirits as the first step to effective spiritual warfare. Opponents of this theological construct, and associated beliefs in "spiritual warfare", point out that while the Bible may describe some form of demonic control over geography, it does not prescribe many of the behaviors and teachings that proponents advocate in response. There is no mention in either the Hebrew Bible or the New Testament of believers banding together and praying a form of "spiritual warfare" against particular territorial demons. The battles occurring in the spiritual realms (as described in Daniel 10) have no Biblically identified link to the actions and prayers of God's people in the physical world.

See also
 Genius loci
 Tutelary deity

References

Footnotes

Bibliography
 Gross, Edward N. Miracles, Demons and Spiritual Warfare: An Urgent Call for Discernment (Grand Rapids: Baker, 1990). 
 Hiebert, Paul G. "Biblical Perspectives on Spiritual Warfare," in Anthropological Reflections on Missiological Issues (Grand Rapids: Baker, 1994), pp. 203–215. 
 Moreau, A Scott. "Religious Borrowing as a Two-Way Street: An introduction to animistic tendencies in the Euro-North American context," in Christianity and the Religions, Edward Rommen and Harold Netland, eds. (Pasadena: William Carey Library, 1995), pp. 166–183. 
 Priest, Robert J. Thomas Campbell and Bradford A. Mullen, "Missiological Syncretism: The New Animistic Paradigm," in Spiritual Power and Missions, Edward Rommem, ed., (Pasadena: William Carey Library, 1995), pp. 143–168.
 Wagner, C. Peter and F. Melvin Prick Tickler, eds., Wrestling With Dark Angels (Ventura: Regal, 1990) 
 Wagner, C. Peter. Breaking Strongholds in Your City (Ventura: Regal, 1993).

Further reading
DeBernardi, Jean. Spiritual warfare and territorial spirits: the globalization and localisation of a "practical theology"  Religious Studies and Theology, 18.2 (1999), p 66–96.
Greenlee, David. "Territorial Spirits Reconsidered" Missiology, 22 no 4 (1994), p 507–514. 
Moreau, A Scott. "Territorial spirits and world evangelisation: a biblical, historical and missiological critique of strategic level spiritual warfare", Evangelical Missions Quarterly, 35.3 (1999), p 354+.
Poythress, Vern S. "Territorial Spirits: Some Biblical Perspectives", Urban Mission, 13 (1995), p 37–49. 
Stevens, David E. "Daniel 10 and the notion of territorial spirits" Bibliotheca Sacra, 157 (2000) p 410–431.

External links
Apologetics Index (Contra)
Spiritual Warfare - Discipleship Model
Deuteronomy 32:8-9 and the sons of God

Spiritual warfare
Charismatic and Pentecostal Christianity
Demons in Christianity
Tutelary deities